Matthew James Aitken (born 25 August 1956) is an English songwriter and record producer, brought up in Astley, Greater Manchester, best known as the creative force behind the 1980s and early 1990s songwriting/production trio Stock Aitken Waterman.

Biography 
He began his musical career as a musician and was a member of many different bands before teaming up with Mike Stock to write and produce music for other artists. They both later teamed up with Pete Waterman, and they went from small independent record labels to the major RCA Records, producing a myriad of hits. According to Waterman, Aitken was a noted perfectionist, particularly when it came to his guitar solos.

After the partnership split up in 1991, Aitken went into a period of retirement, raising his daughters Isabelle and Romy, and pursuing hobbies such as auto racing. He later returned to the music industry in 1994 -- partnering with Mike Stock once again and having success with acts such as Nicki French, Scooch, and Robson & Jerome -- before seemingly retiring again in 2002.

References 

1956 births
Living people
Musicians from Coventry
English songwriters
English record producers